The 1952 National League Division Two was the seventh post-war season of the second tier of motorcycle speedway in Great Britain.

Summary
The post-war boom was now fading and the League was shortened to 12 teams with Division Three now defunct and continued only on a regional basis. Previous champions Norwich Stars had been promoted to Division One. Newcastle, Walthamstow and Halifax had closed whilst Fleetwood Flyers changed to Fleetwood Knights and ran only open meetings. Poole Pirates were the only new entrant, promoted from the former lower tier.

Poole Pirates won the title, having won Division Three in the previous season.

Final table

Top Five Riders (League only)

National Trophy Stage Two
 For Stage One - see Stage One
 For Stage Three - see Stage Three

The 1952 National Trophy was the 15th edition of the Knockout Cup. The Trophy consisted of three stages; stage one was for the third tier clubs, stage two was for the second tier clubs and stage three was for the top tier clubs. The winner of stage one would qualify for stage two and the winner of stage two would qualify for the third and final stage. Poole won stage two and therefore qualified for stage three.

Second Division qualifying first round

Second Division Qualifying Second round

Second Division Qualifying semifinals

Second Division Qualifying final
First leg

Second leg

See also
List of United Kingdom Speedway League Champions
Knockout Cup (speedway)

References

Speedway National League Division Two
Speedway National League Division 2
1952 in speedway